Red Dawn is a Big Finish Productions audio drama based on the long-running British science fiction television series Doctor Who.

Plot
During NASA's first crewed mission to Mars, the Fifth Doctor and Peri encounter one of the Doctor's old adversaries — the Ice Warriors.

This episode addresses issue of scientific and industrial ethics.

Cast
The Doctor — Peter Davison
Peri — Nicola Bryant
Pilot Susan Roberts — Maureen Oakeley
Commder Lee Forbes — Robert Jezek
Paul Webster — Stephen Fewell
Tanya Webster — Georgia Tennant
Sub-Commander Sstast — Hylton Collins
Lord Zzaal — Matthew Brenher
Zizmar — Alistair Lock
Sskann — Jason Haigh-Ellery
Razzburr — Gary Russell

Notes
Georgia Tennant is the real-life daughter of Peter Davison. On television, she played Jenny, the title character, in the 2008 series episode "The Doctor's Daughter" where she met her husband, 10th Doctor actor David Tennant. 
To explain Forbes' decision to sabotage communication with Earth, Paul and the Doctor cite the Brookings Report.  This is a real document, but its proposals about what to do if alien artifacts are found are more equivocal than are presented in this story. In the story, it states that, if NASA found evidence of alien life, they should suppress that information in order for humanity to survive.
The Fifth Doctor returns to Mars and meets the Ice Warriors ancestors in The Judgement of Isskar.
This is Peri's first adventure after Planet of Fire and the rest of the adventures and companions that join, fill the gap between Planet of Fire and The Caves of Androzani.

External links
Big Finish Productions – Red Dawn

Fifth Doctor audio plays
Fiction set on Mars
2000 audio plays
Works about astronauts